The  Washington Redskins season was the franchise's 83rd season in the National Football League and the first season under head coach Jay Gruden. The Redskins finished the season 4–12, slightly improving on their 3–13 record from 2013 and resulted in the departure of defensive coordinator Jim Haslett.

Draft

Draft trades
 The Redskins traded their first-round selection, along with their 2012 first- and second-round selections and their 2013 first-round selection to the St. Louis Rams in exchange for the Rams' 2012 first-round selection.
 The Redskins traded their original second-round selection (No. 34 overall) to the Dallas Cowboys in exchange for the Cowboys' second- (No. 47 overall) and third- (No. 78 overall) round selections.
 The Redskins traded their original sixth-round selection (No. 178 overall) to the Tennessee Titans in exchange for the Titans' sixth- (No. 186 overall) and seventh- (No. 228 overall) round selections.

Staff

Final roster

Preseason

Regular season

Schedule

Note: Intra-division opponents are in bold text.

Game summaries

Week 1: at Houston Texans

Week 2: vs. Jacksonville Jaguars

Week 3: at Philadelphia Eagles

Week 4: vs. New York Giants

Week 5: vs. Seattle Seahawks

Week 6: at Arizona Cardinals

Week 7: vs. Tennessee Titans

Week 8: at Dallas Cowboys

Colt McCoy made his first start as a Redskin. With the win, the Redskins snapped an eight-game losing streak against division opponents.

Week 9: at Minnesota Vikings

Week 11: vs. Tampa Bay Buccaneers

Week 12: at San Francisco 49ers

Week 13: at Indianapolis Colts

With the loss, Washington fell to 3–9, 2–2 against the AFC South, and was officially eliminated from playoff contention for a second straight year.

Week 14: vs. St. Louis Rams

Week 15: at New York Giants

Week 16: vs. Philadelphia Eagles

Week 17: vs. Dallas Cowboys

Standings

Division

Conference

Honors
Prior to the 2014 season, three Redskins were voted onto the NFL Network's Top 100 Players of 2014. Pierre Garçon was voted by his peers as the 80th best player overall in the league while DeSean Jackson and Trent Williams landed at spots 63 and 60, respectively. While Williams improved in rank from #99 in 2013, teammates Robert Griffin III and Alfred Morris, who were voted 15th and 64th the previous season, did not make the 2014 list.

References

Washington
Washington Redskins seasons
Red